Sheep Hills is a locality in the northern Wimmera region, north-west Victoria. It is 271 km north-west of Melbourne.  The town is situated on the railway line south-east of Warracknabeal, north of Minyip.

The original inhabitants of the area around Sheep Hills were the Wotjobaluk, an Aboriginal Australian people.

Sheep Hills was the name of a farm operated by Archibald McMillan in 1847. The population boosted in the mid-1870s when many migrants, mostly German and Scottish, began farming in the area.  The district was named Bangerang (the name of a Lutheran school) and Tarkedia (the name of a State school). In 1886 the railway from Minyip was extended to Warracknabeal, and many settled around the station, forming the township under the name of Sheep Hills.

As of 2016, Sheep Hills has a cricket, a golf and a tennis club. Also in use is the Sheep Hills Town Hall.

References

External links

Towns in Victoria (Australia)
Wimmera